One Wild Oat is a 1951 British comedy film directed by Charles Saunders and starring Stanley Holloway, Robertson Hare and Sam Costa with appearances by a pre-stardom Audrey Hepburn and Roger Moore as extras.

Plot
Barrister Humphrey Proudfoot attempts to discourage his Cherrie's infatuation for Fred, a philanderer, by revealing Fred's past. The plan backfires when Alfred Gilbey, the daughter's would-be father-in-law, threatens to reveal the barrister's own shady background.

Cast
 Robertson Hare as Humphrey Proudfoot
 Stanley Holloway as Alfred Gilbey
 Sam Costa as Mr. Pepys
 Andrew Crawford as Fred Gilbey
 Vera Pearce as Mrs. Gilbey
 June Sylvaine as Cherrie Proudfoot
 Robert Moreton as Throstle
 Constance Lorne as Mrs. Proudfoot
 Gwen Cherrell as Audrey Cuttle #1
 Irene Handl as Emily Pepys (Audrey Cuttle #2)
 Ingeborg von Kusserow as Gloria Samson (as Ingeborg Wells)
 Charles Groves as Charles
 Joan Rice as Annie (maid)
 Audrey Hepburn as the Hotel receptionist
 Fred Berger as Samson
 William Fox as the porter
 Roger Moore (uncredited) had a bit part

Production

It was made at the Riverside Studios in Hammersmith with sets designed by the art director Ivan King. The film was adapted by Vernon Sylvaine from his 1948 play One Wild Oat. The stage production debuted at the Garrick Theatre in London and was directed by Jack Buchanan.

The stage version starred Robertson Hare, who reprised his role for the film, and Arthur Riscoe (who replaced Alfred Drayton following his death in 1949), the part being played by Stanley Holloway in the screen version.  The stage cast were (in order of appearance): Julie Mortimer, Constance Lorne, Robertson Hare, George Bradford/Robert Moreton, June Sylvaine, Arthur Riscoe, John Stone, Ruth Maitland, Tom Squire, Charles Groves, Anne Stapledon, Horace Sequeira and Helene Burls.

Notes
In addition to the film featuring early appearances from future stars Audrey Hepburn and Roger Moore, the role of Cherrie (June Sylvaine) was played, in the stage and film version, by the wife of the author (Vernon Sylvaine).  Audrey has a thirty-second scene as a hotel receptionist. Interesting to note that thirteen years later, she would be the star and Holloway the support in My Fair Lady.

During the play's West End run, the Garrick Theatre and two cast members were featured in a humorous cameo scene, reading The Stage newspaper (probably looking for new jobs due to London's anticipated destruction), in the 1950 film Seven Days to Noon (see still).

There was a television version of the play shown by the BBC in 1972 starring Brian Rix.

External links

1951 films
Films directed by Charles Saunders
British comedy films
1951 comedy films
British films based on plays
Films shot at Riverside Studios
Films set in London
British black-and-white films
1950s English-language films
1950s British films